Hip Hop was the mascot of the Philadelphia 76ers basketball team. A rabbit character, Hip Hop usually entertained Sixers fans during halftime and time-outs by performing acrobatic slam dunks from a trampoline, often over an item or person, such as a motorcycle, a Sixer Dancer, a fan, or a ladder. 

Hip Hop also appeared at various Sixers publicity events and fundraisers.

Assisting Hip Hop at every home game were a sidekick, Lil Hip Hop, and a group of helpers, known as the Hare Raisers.

It was revealed Hip-Hop would not be returning post lockout under new Sixers ownership. The decision was unanimous from the new owners.

References
 Sixers say goodbye to Hip-Hop, 6ABC
 76ers' next mascot: a Philly-inspired animal, Philly.com

External links
 Philadelphia 76ers official website

Animal mascots
National Basketball Association mascots
Sports in Philadelphia